Al-Rajhi may refer to:

People
 Farhat Rajhi, Tunisian politician
 Saleh Abdul Aziz Al Rajhi, Saudi businessman
 Sulaiman Abdul Aziz Al Rajhi, Saudi businessman

Other uses
 Sulaiman Al Rajhi Colleges., Saudi college
 Al-Rajhi Bank, Saudi bank
 Al Rajhi Tower, Proposed skyscraper in Riyadh, Saudi Arabia

Arabic-language surnames